Strymon is a genus of scrub hairstreak butterflies in the family Lycaenidae. It is a highly distinct lineage in the tribe Eumaeini, and was at one time even treated as a monotypic tribe Strymonini. The species of the genus are found in the Nearctic, the Palearctic and the Neotropical realms.

List of species

Strymon acis
Strymon aeroides
Strymon albata
Strymon alea
Strymon aliparops
Strymon amphyporphyra
Strymon andrewi
Strymon arola
Strymon astiocha
Strymon atrofasciata
Strymon avalona
Strymon baptistorum
Strymon basalides
Strymon basilides
Strymon bazochii
Strymon bebrycia
Strymon borus
Strymon bubastus
Strymon buchholzi
Strymon caryaevorus
Strymon cestri
Strymon chlorophora
Strymon clarionensis
Strymon columella
Strymon coolinensis
Strymon coronos
Strymon crambusa
Strymon crossoea
Strymon cyanofusca
Strymon cycnus
Strymon desertorum
Strymon echion
Strymon falacer
Strymon faunalia
Strymon favonius
Strymon fentoni
Strymon flavaria
Strymon fletcheri
Strymon franki
Strymon gerhardi
Strymon godarti
Strymon golbachi
Strymon humuli
Strymon hyperici
Strymon ilicis
Strymon istapa
Strymon lacyi
Strymon lariyojoa
Strymon limenia
Strymon liparops
Strymon lorrainea
Strymon lynceus
Strymon martialis
Strymon maura
Strymon melinus
Strymon montanensis
Strymon mulucha
Strymon nicolayi
Strymon obsoleta
Strymon pan
Strymon peristictos
Strymon provo
Strymon pruina
Strymon pruni
Strymon rhaptos
Strymon rufofusca
Strymon serapio
Strymon setonia
Strymon silenus non Fabricius, 1775
Strymon souhegan
Strymon spini
Strymon strigosa
Strymon yojoa
Strymon ziba

External links

"Strymon Hübner, 1818" at Markku Savela's Lepidoptera and Some Other Life Forms

 
Butterflies of North America
Butterflies of Central America
Butterflies of the Caribbean
Lycaenidae of South America
Eumaeini
Lycaenidae genera
Taxa named by Jacob Hübner